Per Roald Bauhn (born 23 July 1960 in Markaryd, Kronoberg County) is a Swedish philosopher and a professor of practical philosophy at the University of Kalmar since 2004, and at Linnaeus University since 2010.
His main subjects include the study of ethics and political philosophy. Per Bauhn has authored books on topics as diverse as nationalism, political terrorism, the virtue of courage, and the duty to rescue. He has also contributed to the field of philosophical aesthetics.  His philosophical work is inspired by the agency-based ethical theory of Alan Gewirth. Per Bauhn is married (since 2013) to Turkish sociologist and women's studies scholar Fatma Fulya Tepe.

Writings 
 (1989) Ethical Aspects of Political Terrorism : The Sacrificing of the Innocent, Lund: Lund University Press; Bromley: Chartwell-Bratt.
 (1995) Nationalism and Morality, Lund: Lund University Press; Bromley: Chartwell-Bratt.
 (1995) Multiculturalism and Nationhood in Canada : The Cases of First Nations and Quebec (co-authors: Christer Lindberg & Svante Lundberg), Lund: Lund University Press; Bromley: Chartwell-Bratt.
 (1998) "Universal Rights and the Historical Context", European Journal of Development Research. 10:2. 19–32.
 (2003) The Value of Courage, Lund: Nordic Academic Press,  (hardback).
 (2009) "Aesthetic Identity, Well-Being, and the Right to Beauty", The International Journal of the Arts in Society. 4:1. 71–80.
 (2011) "The Extension and Limits of the Duty to Rescue", Public Reason. 3:1. 39–49.
 (2013) "The Duty to Rescue and the Duty to Aid the Starving", International Dialogue: A Multidisciplinary Journal of World Affairs. 3. 4-37.
 (2014) "Art, Magic, and Agency", The International Journal of Arts Theory and History. 9:1. 1-10.
 (2016) Gewirthian Perspectives on Human Rights (ed.), Abingdon: Routledge, .
 (2017) Normative Identity, London and New York: Rowman & Littlefield, .

References
 Per Bauhn's personal webpage at Linnaeus University.

1960 births
Living people
People from Markaryd Municipality
Lund University alumni
Swedish philosophers
Political philosophers